Marian Józef Żegota-Januszajtis (3 April 1889, Częstochowa, Piotrków Governorate - 24 March 1973, Royal Tunbridge Wells) was a Polish military commander and politician. One of the founders of Polish paramilitary pro-independence organizations in Austrian partition, and last commander of the 1st Brigade of Polish Legions.

He was also the organizer of unsuccessful coup in 1919, general in the Second Polish Republic and Polish Armed Forces in the West, voivode of the Nowogródek Voivodeship (1924-1926), and member of the Polish government in Exile.

Following the Soviet invasion of Poland he founded the Organization for the Struggle for Freedom in Lwów. He was arrested by NKVD on 27 October 1939 and imprisoned in Lwów and then in Moscow Lubyanka prison. After the Sikorski-Mayski Agreement of July 1941, he was released. After the war, he remained in exile in the United Kingdom, where he died in March 1973 and was buried in Crawley cemetery next to his wife. In November 1981, his ashes were brought to Poland – resting in the New Cemetery in Zakopane, in legionnaires' quarters.

Honours and awards
 Silver Cross of the Order of Virtuti Militari (1921)
 Commander's Cross of the Order of Polonia Restituta
 Cross of Independence
 Cross of Valour (four times)
 Officer's badge "Parasol"
 Knight's Cross of the Legion of Honour (France)

References

1889 births
1973 deaths
People from Częstochowa
People from Piotrków Governorate
Polish generals
National Party (Poland) politicians
Association of the Polish Youth "Zet" members
Polish exiles
Polish Rifle Squads members
Polish legionnaires (World War I)
Polnische Wehrmacht personnel
Recipients of the Cross of Independence
Chevaliers of the Légion d'honneur
Recipients of the Silver Cross of the Virtuti Militari
Commanders of the Order of Polonia Restituta
Recipients of the Cross of Valour (Poland)
Polish nationalists
Polish people of the Polish–Soviet War
Polish deportees to Soviet Union
Polish people detained by the NKVD
Polish people of Lithuanian descent